Aphonopelma atomicum is a species of spiders in the family Theraphosidae, found in United States (California, Nevada). Like many New World tarantulas, they flick urticating hairs at attackers if threatened.

References

atomicum
Spiders described in 2016
Spiders of the United States
Endemic fauna of California
Fauna without expected TNC conservation status